Leo Zurabovich Goglichidze (born 29 April 1997) is a Russian football player of Georgian origin. He plays as a left back for FC Ural Yekaterinburg.

Club career
He made his debut in the Russian Professional Football League for FC Krasnodar-2 on 6 November 2014 in a game against FC Sochi.

He made his debut for the main squad of FC Krasnodar in the Russian Cup game against PFC Spartak Nalchik on 21 September 2016.

He made his Russian Football National League debut for FC Olimpiyets Nizhny Novgorod on 11 April 2018 in a game against FC Yenisey Krasnoyarsk.

On 30 August 2019, he joined FC Chayka Peschanokopskoye on loan. In the summer of 2020, he moved to Chayka on a permanent basis.

On 13 January 2021, FC Krasnodar bought back his rights from Chayka and then sent him on loan to FC Nizhny Novgorod until the end of the 2020–21 season, with Nizhny Novgorod holding an option to make the transfer permanent at the end of the loan term. On 19 June 2021, he returned to FC Nizhny Novgorod on another loan. He made his Russian Premier League debut for FC Nizhny Novgorod on 26 July 2021 in a game against PFC Sochi.

On 2 September 2021, Krasnodar recalled him from loan and he joined FC Ural Yekaterinburg on loan instead.

On 28 May 2022, Goglichidze moved to Ural on a permanent basis and signed a long-term contract with the club.

Career statistics

References

External links
 
 

1997 births
Sportspeople from Rostov-on-Don
Russian people of Georgian descent
Living people
Russian footballers
Russia under-21 international footballers
Association football defenders
FC Krasnodar-2 players
FC Krasnodar players
FC Nizhny Novgorod (2015) players
FC Chayka Peschanokopskoye players
FC Ural Yekaterinburg players
Russian Premier League players
Russian First League players
Russian Second League players